Selfcaged is the third EP by Swedish extreme metal band Meshuggah. It was initially recorded as a demo for the upcoming album Destroy Erase Improve but was eventually released in 1995 by Nuclear Blast as a teaser for the next album. Re-recordings of the tracks 1–3 on this EP appear on  Destroy Erase Improve.

The album art, created by artist Alex Grey, features the centerpiece of his work "Deities and Demons Drinking from the Milky Pool".

Track listing

US version

Personnel
Jens Kidman – vocals
 Fredrik Thordendal – lead guitar, bass, synthesizer
 Mårten Hagström – rhythm guitar
 Tomas Haake – drums, spoken vocals
 Peter Nordin – bass

References

1995 EPs
Meshuggah albums
Nuclear Blast EPs